islaSol I, formerly known as SaCaSol II is a 18-megawatt (MW) photovoltaic power station developed by Bronzeoak Philippines for San Carlos Solar Energy Inc. (SaCaSol), in La Carlota, Negros Occidental. It covers 247,300 m² and supplies about 41,000 people with energy. The solar park is operated by Negros Island Solar Power Inc. The estimated reduction of CO2 is more than 14,000 metric tons per year.

islaSol I, follows SaCaSol I, the country's largest solar farm currently being expanded from 22 MW to 45 MW. There is also a third project under construction, islaSol II, with a capacity of 48 megawatts.

References 

Photovoltaic power stations in the Philippines
Buildings and structures in Negros Occidental